Papineau may refer to:

Places
Canada
Papineau Regional County Municipality, Quebec
Papineau (electoral district), a federal electoral district within Montreal
Papineau station on the Montréal Métro.
Papineau (provincial electoral district), a provincial electoral district in Quebec (Outaouais region)

United States
Papineau, Illinois

Other uses
Papineau (surname)
Papineau (horse), a thoroughbred racehorse